Events in the year 1785 in Norway.

Incumbents
Monarch: Christian VII

Events

Arts and literature

 12 January - The first public library in Norway is opened.
 Frelseren Church was built.

Births
1 August - Georg Jacob Bull, jurist and politician (d.1854)

Full date unknown
Gustav Peter Blom, politician (d.1869)
Michel Nielsen Grendahl, politician (d.1849)
Knut Mevasstaul, rose painter (d.1862)

Deaths
29 December - Johan Herman Wessel, poet (b.1742)

See also

References